Harindanaga is a village within the jurisdiction of the Mathurapur police station in the Mathurapur I CD block in the Diamond Harbour subdivision of the South 24 Parganas district in the Indian state of West Bengal.

Geography

Demographics
As per 2011 Census of India, Harindanaga had a total population of 1,436.

Transport
A stretch of a local road links Harindanaga to the State Highway 1.

Healthcare
Mathurapur Rural Hospital at Mathurapur, with 60 beds, is the major government medical facility in the Mathurapur I CD block.

References 

Villages in South 24 Parganas district